John Gillespie (15 November 1870 – 4 September 1933) was a Scottish footballer who played as a defender.

Career
Born in Falkirk, Gillespie played club football mainly for Falkirk and Queen's Park, with his amateur status allowing him to make guest appearances for several clubs, including Rangers, Partick Thistle, St Johnstone and Everton. With Queen's Park he won the Scottish Cup in 1893 (after being a losing finalist in 1892), the Glasgow League in 1896–97, and the Glasgow Cup in 1898. He then served in the Imperial Yeomanry in the Boer War.

He made one appearance for Scotland in 1896.

See also
List of Scotland national football team captains

References

1870 births
1933 deaths
Scottish footballers
Scotland international footballers
Falkirk F.C. players
Queen's Park F.C. players
Rangers F.C. players
Association football defenders
Footballers from Falkirk